Fast Track Racing (also known as Fast Track High Performance Racing or Fast Track Racing Enterprises) is an American professional stock car racing team that currently competes full time in the ARCA Menards Series and ARCA Menards Series East, fielding the Nos. 01, 10, 11, 12 for various drivers. They also compete part-time in the ARCA Menards Series West. The team has also competed in NASCAR's top 3 Series as well as the IndyCar Series in the past.

ARCA Menards Series History

Car No. 11 history 

Following his victory in the season opening ARCA 200, Andy Hillenburg fielded his own car for the remaining 20 races of the season. Andy went on to win once more at Flat Rock Speedway, before battling down the stretch to claim the 1995 ARCA BONDO/MAR-HYDE SERIES Championship.

On December 6th, 2022, the team announced that Zachary Tinkle would be driving the No. 11 for the full 2023 ARCA Menards Series East, including the four combination races with the 2023 ARCA Menards Series

Car No. 11 results

ARCA Menards Series East

ARCA Menards Series West

Car No. 10 history 
Towards the end of 2018, it was announced that Tommy Vigh Jr. would pilot the #10 car for the full 2019 campaign.

With sponsorship from Extreme Kleaner, Tommy would go on to post one Top 10 finish, and hold on to earn the Rookie of the Year award. Vigh became the oldest recipient of such an award in ARCA Racing Series history.

Ken Schrader piloted his old friend's #10 in two races, DuQuoin and Salem Speedway. This stretch produced one top 5, a 3rd place at DuQuoin, and two top 10's.

Car No. 10 results

ARCA Menards Series East

ARCA Menards Series West

Car No. 12 history 

For the first time in its history, Fast Track fielded a third car at the season opening Lucas Oil 200 for 2018, borrowing the #06 from Wayne Peterson Racing. Chuck Hiers piloted the car in this race, leading 1 lap and finishing 16th.

Fast Track Opened opened up the 2019 season in Daytona again with Chuck Hiers behind the wheel of the teams new number 1 car. Chuck finished the race 14th.

Following the 2020 Merger of ARCA and the NASCAR K&N Pro Series divisions, Team Owner Andy Hillenburg opted to change number one to 12 in order for Hattori Racing Enterprises to maintain their usage of the No. 1 from K&N.

On January 2, 2023, it was announced D.L. Wilson would return to the team's #12 car for a total of 9 races; the full East Series season, and the Spring Phoenix Raceway event. The other 15 2023 ARCA Menards Series races remain TBA.

Car No. 12 Results

ARCA Menards Series East

ARCA Menards Series West

Car No. 01 history 

For 2020, Fast Track expanded to a fourth car for select races, beginning with the season opening Lucas Oil 200 at Daytona.

On December 22, 2021, Stephanie Moyer announced a partnership with Fast Track for the full 2022 ARCA Menards Series East season, including the combination races at Iowa Speedway, The Milwaukee Mile & Bristol Motor Speedway. She later announced the addition of Pocono Raceway to her schedule.

Moyer finished the Season in fourth place, becoming the highest placing woman in East Series history.

Following the completion of the 2022 ARCA Menards Series, the team will field the #01 for Zach Herrin in the West Series finale at Phoenix Raceway.

Car No. 01 results

ARCA Menards Series East

ARCA Menards Series West

 Season still in progress 
 Ineligible for series points

Xfinity Series History 

In the NASCAR Busch Series (now Xfinity), Hillenburg entered one race in both 1992 and 1993 in his car, the No. 42, before running a part-time schedule of six races in 1994, although he only qualified for one of those six races. His team did not return until 1997, where he entered his own No. 25 car at Dover. This was his last attempt as a car owner in that series.

Camping World Truck series 

Fast Track also formerly fielded entries in Truck Series. Most notably, they fielded the No. 47 and 48 teams in between the 2007 and 2010. He previously had fielded a No. 10 truck in two races in 2003 NASCAR Craftsman Truck Series.

Cup Series History 

Besides two races in 1992, Fast Track's only Cup Series attempt came in the 2007 Daytona 500, with them entering the No. 71 Ford driven by Frank Kimmel in the 2007 Daytona 500, but the entry did not make the field.

IndyCar Series History

IRL IndyCar Series results

Indianapolis 500 results

External links 
 Official Website

References  

NASCAR teams
IndyCar Series teams
ARCA Menards Series teams
Cabarrus County, North Carolina
1991 establishments in North Carolina